Jassi Jaissi Koi Nahin is an Indian soap opera which aired on Sony Entertainment Television from 1 September 2003 to 4 May 2006. The series was an Indian-themed version of the Colombian drama Yo soy Betty, la fea.

Plot 
Based largely on the show, Yo soy Betty, la fea, the show follows the life of Jasmeet Walia known as Jassi (Mona Singh) who is a plain-looking young woman from a middle-class family in Mumbai. Jassi is a sincere worker and has been working to support her family. She is naive but intelligent. She has always been supported and encouraged by her father, grandmother (Bebe), and her close friend Nandu (Gaurav Gera) but she has faced rejection largely from society simply because of her looks. Jassi somehow lands her dream job at Gulmohur, a big fashion empire. She is appointed as the secretary to Armaan Suri (Apurva Agnihotri) and after a rough start soon becomes indispensable at work. She falls in love with Armaan but keeps her feelings to herself.

The show follows how Jassi becomes successful at Gulmohur but must face difficulties and trouble created by several people unhappy with her success, one of whom is Armaan's arrogant girlfriend Mallika (Rakshanda Khan). She is forced to disappear when things get too murky and is saved by businessman Purab Mehra (Samir Soni) who eventually becomes responsible for Jassi's makeover so she can hide her real identity and avenge the wrongs done to her and her family. Meanwhile, Armaan falls in love with Jassi, and while mourning her disappearance, is inexplicably attracted to her alter ego Jessica Bedi.

In the end, Armaan and Jassi unite and gain control of Gulmohur.

Cast 
 Mona Singh as Jasmeet Walia (Jassi) also called Chasmish Chuhiya in negative tone / Jessica Bedi (Model of Gulmohar & Jasmin Collection)/ Neha Shastri (History & Drama Teacher) / Jasmeet Armaan Suri / Vedika's Adoptive Mother-She is  an economist and Chairman Personal assistant with secretary in Gulmohar . Apparently ugly woman but very skilled in economics with a good CV. She is the pride of her father. She is in love with Armaan Suri but when she gets a new look, Armaan marries her, Armaan’s wife
 Apurva Agnihotri as Armaan Suri, the heir to the Gulmohar business empire who starts out as a rich and arrogant businessman, Jassi's lover/husband & Vedika's Adoptive Father.He is a chairman of Gulmohar. Inept playboy with only knowledge in industrial engineering who presents a risky and ambitious proposal with which he wins the presidency of Gulmohar. Managing it brings the company to the brink of bankruptcy.
 Rakshanda Khan as Mallika Seth-She is fashionista and Armaan's girlfriend from a well to do business family,main antagonist, Armaan's fiancée and Gulmohar's stockholder and point-of-sale manager. She is not really bad but a woman full of dignity who loves Armaan and hates lovers of Armaan. She hates Jassi as she covers up his constant infidelities.
 Parmeet Sethi as Raj Malhotra-He is Armaan's best friend and Gulmohar's commercial vice president. Playboy inveterate enemy of commitments and fatherhood. 
 Gaurav Gera as Nandan Verma (Nandu), Jassi's best friend
 Manini Mishra as Pari Kapadia-She is antagonist; Mallika's best friend and secretary. Divorced woman, refined and superficial, as well as a materialist who is looking for a rich husband. Armaan hates her because she is a silly blonde and knows that Mallika wants her as Armaan's secretary to watch over her infidelities.
 Jayati Bhatia as Bindiya, Jassi's friend
 Pushtiie Shakti as Maithili, Jassi's friend
 Pubali Sanyal as Nazneen, Jassi's friend
 Shabnam Sayed as Maria, Jassi's friend
 Trishala as Trishala, Jassi's friend
 Uttara Baokar as Jassi's grandmother who she fondly calls Bebe
 Virendra Saxena as Balwant Walia (Billoo), Jassi's father who has always encouraged her
 Surinder Kaur as Amrit Walia, Jassi's mother
 Amar Talwar as Purushottam Suri, Armaan's father
 Mahru Sheikh as Ila Suri, Armaan's mother
 Samir Soni as Purab Mehra, a successful businessman who helps Jassi overcome her fears and knows her identity all along (Dead in Episode 388)
 Zain Khan as Rohan
 Shyam pathak  (episode 186) as Raddiwala
 Vinay Jain as Aryan Seth, Mallika's brother and Armaan's nemesis who will go to any lengths to get control of the Gulmohar empire Vedika's Father (Dead)(Negative Role)
 Rajesh Khera as Maddy, Gulmohar's fashion designer
 Navneet Nishan as Hansmukhi
 Shweta Salve as Arundhati Roy
 Vrajesh Hirjee as Computer Hacker
 Raman Trikha as Lucky
 Sandhya Mridul as Yaana
 Sandhya Shetty as Kareena Modi
 Anupama Verma as Sheetal Ambuja
 Mandira Bedi as herself
 Divya Dutta as herself
 Karan Oberoi as himself &  Raghav Oberoi
 Vikas Bhalla as Chiranjeev (CJ) Oberoi in antagonist
 Neena Gupta as Nandini
 Rakhee Tandon as Anjali (Angel) Suri, Armaan's sister
 Aman Verma as Advocate Thakral
 Sakshi Tanwar as Advocate Indira Bhargav
 Rohit Bakshi as Rahul
 Shilpa Saklani as Vidhi Vedika's Mother
 Chinky Jaiswal as Vedika  Vidhi's Daughter / Jassi & Armaan's Adoptive Daughter 
 Nitin Arora as Detective
 Gauri Pradhan Tejwani as Gauri Pradhan
 Vikram Sahu as Dhanraj
 Shweta Kawatra as Meenakshi
 Niyati Joshi as Jyoti (Jo) Khatri
 Pooja Ghai Rawal as Riya
 Uday Tikekar as Father Rodricks
 Sanjay Batra as Public Prosecutor
 Kanwaljit Singh as Shiv Pratap Oberoi 
 Shubhavi Choksey as Meera Oberoi 
 Salil Acharya as Armaan's cousin
 Kishori Shahane as Doctor
 Ketki Dave as Vrinda Khatri
 Sooraj Thapar as Charles
 Rajesh Khattar as Parvatlal Singh
 Apara Mehta as Naseem Aapa
 Sanjay Batra as Advocate Rajkumar Jha
 Neeru Bajwa as Neha Shastri

Guest appearances
 Saif Ali Khan as Karan Kapoor: To promote his film Hum Tum (In May 2004)
 Malaika Arora for Loreal Paris Fashion Fiesta Advertisement in episode no 275 
 Vandana Luthra as herself in Episode 306
 Rupali Tiwari as herself from NDTV News Host in Episode 343
 Neeta Lulla Designed Jassi's Bridal Outfit 
 Neelam Kothari Designed Jassi's Bridal Jewellery

Development 
Jassi Jaisi Koi Nahi is also known for its remarkable campaigning and marketing done by the channel to attract a huge audience before its launch. The main protagonist 'Jasmeet Walia' was hidden completely from the audience in promotions although the campaigning was targeted totally on the character's uniqueness. This generated a lot of curiosity among its audience to know about the character. This was perhaps the first an Indian Television Channel took such a big risk to keep its series protagonist under wraps and still promoting it heavily. The risk, however, paid off and the show opened with a bumper response on its premiere episode. The TV show was well received and it went on to run for three years.

Reception 
The show opened with a bumper response and the ratings were very strong for the first 100 episodes. After that, the ratings started to dwindle and didn't pick up although the channel did not lose hope in the show. As soon as the protagonist goes through her makeover, the ratings shot up again and the show came back at the top spot. However, the ratings fell again once the main objective of the show was fulfilled. The show ran for some more time before going off air in early 2006.

A special episode aired on 5 March 2005 garnered 10.9 TVR.

Awards and nominations

References

External links 

 Jassi Jaissi Koi Nahin on Sony Liv

Yo soy Betty, la fea
2003 Indian television series debuts
Sony Entertainment Television original programming
Indian television soap operas
Television shows set in Mumbai
2007 Indian television series endings
Indian television series based on non-Indian television series
Fashion-themed television series